Stéphane Auguste Ernest Demol (born 11 March 1966) is a Belgian former professional footballer who played as a central defender, and a current manager.

He amassed Belgian First Division A totals of 120 games and 11 goals over the course of seven seasons, mainly with Anderlecht and Standard Liège with which he won eight major titles combined. He also competed professionally in Italy, Portugal, France, Greece and Switzerland.

Demol represented Belgium in two World Cups. In 2000 he started a managerial career, going on to work in several countries.

Club career
Born in Watermael-Boitsfort, Brussels, Demol joined local R.S.C. Anderlecht's youth system at the age of 14, moving to the first-team setup four years later and scoring four Belgian First Division A goals in just 17 matches in his first full professional season, as the capital side renewed their domestic supremacy.

Demol soon became noticed by several clubs abroad, moving to Italy for Bologna FC, but his breakthrough would arrive the following year, in Portugal with FC Porto: he scored an astonishing 11 Primeira Liga goals, and helped his team win the national championship.

Demol moved countries again after just one year, now signing with French side Toulouse FC, but he returned in late 1991 to his country after joining Standard Liège, where he helped to consecutive UEFA Cup qualifications, finishing second to Anderlecht in his second year.

Aged 27, Demol signed with Cercle Brugge KSV, but did not receive regular playing time. He subsequently returned for another abroad spell, being equally unsuccessful for S.C. Braga, Panionios GSS, FC Lugano and Sporting Toulon Var (the latter in the French second division).

Demol ended his career in 2000 at 34, after playing one year apiece with FC Denderleeuw and amateurs SK Halle, in which he began his manager career. In 2005, after several brief head coaching spells, he became assistant manager at former club Standard Liège, helping it to another runner-up position, trailing, once again, Anderlecht.

On 2 November 2009, Demol quit R. Charleroi S.C. due to poor results. On 15 February 2012, he was appointed at FC Brussels.

International career
Demol played 38 matches for the Belgium national team and scored one goal, heading home in the round-of-16 clash against the Soviet Union at the 1986 FIFA World Cup in Mexico (4–3 after extra time).

In 2006, his good friend and ex-teammate René Vandereycken became the Red Devils' coach, and he invited Demol to become its assistant manager. He left the post two years later, returning to club action.

International goals
Scores and results list Belgium goal tally first.

Honours

Player 
RSC Anderlecht

 Belgian First Division: 1984–85, 1985–86, 1986–87
 Belgian Cup: 1987-88
 Belgian Supercup: 1985, 1987

FC Porto

 Primeira Liga: 1989–90

Standard Liège

 Belgian Cup: 1992–93

International 
Belgium

 FIFA World Cup: 1986 (fourth place)

Individual 

 Kicker FIFA World Cup All-Star Team: 1986
 World Soccer Magazine World XI: 1990

References

External links

1966 births
Living people
People from Watermael-Boitsfort
Belgian footballers
Association football defenders
Belgian Pro League players
Challenger Pro League players
R.S.C. Anderlecht players
Standard Liège players
Cercle Brugge K.S.V. players
F.C.V. Dender E.H. players
Serie A players
Bologna F.C. 1909 players
Primeira Liga players
FC Porto players
S.C. Braga players
Ligue 1 players
Ligue 2 players
Toulouse FC players
SC Toulon players
Super League Greece players
Panionios F.C. players
Swiss Super League players
FC Lugano players
Belgium international footballers
1986 FIFA World Cup players
1990 FIFA World Cup players
Belgian expatriate footballers
Expatriate footballers in Italy
Expatriate footballers in Portugal
Expatriate footballers in France
Expatriate footballers in Greece
Expatriate footballers in Switzerland
Belgian expatriate sportspeople in Portugal
Belgian expatriate sportspeople in Italy
Belgian expatriate sportspeople in France
Belgian expatriate sportspeople in Greece
Belgian expatriate sportspeople in Switzerland
Belgian expatriate sportspeople in Cyprus
Belgian expatriate sportspeople in Saudi Arabia
Belgian football managers
K.V. Turnhout managers
K.V. Mechelen managers
F.C.V. Dender E.H. managers
R. Charleroi S.C. managers
R.W.D.M. Brussels F.C. managers
Egaleo F.C. managers
PAS Giannina F.C. managers
Ethnikos Achna FC managers
Aris Limassol FC managers
Stephane Demol
Al-Faisaly FC managers
Hajer Club managers
Belgian expatriate football managers
Expatriate football managers in Cyprus
Expatriate football managers in Saudi Arabia
Expatriate football managers in Thailand
Footballers from Brussels